The following articles detail the noble and royal titles associated with the Isle of Man, a self-governing British Crown dependency in the Irish Sea between the islands of Great Britain and Ireland:
King of Mann and the Isles (defunct) 
King of Mann (defunct)
Lord of Mann

See also 
 Bishop of Sodor and Man

History of the Isle of Man
Noble titles of the Isle of Man
Society of the Isle of Man